Charles M'Mombwa (born 14 March 1998) is an Australian professional footballer who plays as a midfielder for A-League club Macarthur FC.

M'Mombwa made his professional debut for Central Coast Mariners on 1 August 2018 in an FFA Cup match against Adelaide United, where he came on as a substitute for six minutes.

Early life 
M'Mombwa was born in Baraka, Democratic Republic of the Congo, on 14 March 1998. He and his family fled to Zimbabwe early on, him growing up there until after a decade, when he migrated to Casula in Sydney's south-west.

M'Mombwa's father was both a football player and coach when he resided in DR Congo.

Club career

Central Coast Mariners 
After coming through the Mariners academy, M'Mombwa debuted for the club in an FFA Cup match against Adelaide United. He played his first and only A-League game for Central Coast in their 8–2 loss against Wellington Phoenix FC.

Macarthur FC 
On 20 November 2020, Macarthur FC announced the signing of M'Mombwa for their inaugural season.

On 12 June 2020, M'Mombwa scored the first of Macarthur's two goals in their extra time 2–0 win against Central Coast Mariners, in the 2020–21 A-League Finals series. This was the club's first win in an A-League Finals match.

Honours
Macarthur
Australia Cup: 2022

References

External links

1998 births
Living people
Australian soccer players
Association football midfielders
Central Coast Mariners FC players
Macarthur FC players
National Premier Leagues players
Australian people of Democratic Republic of the Congo descent